The first season of Big Brother Célébrités began airing on January 10, 2021. Based on the worldwide franchise of the same name, it saw fifteen "celebrity" housemates competing to win the show's grand prize. It is the third French language adaptation of the series to be held in Canada, following Loft Story (2003–09) and a civilian version of Big Brother (2010). Marie-Mai Bouchard served as the show's host during its thirteen-week run, concluding on 11 April 2021, when comedian Jean-Thomas Jobin was named the winner, winning $50,000 for himself, $50,000 to a charity of his choice, and a new automobile.

Housemates

Voting history

Notes 
 :  On Day 15, a Mystery Box appeared in the house. To open the box, housemates had to solve an equation. If they answered incorrectly, they would not be able to guess anymore. Camille guessed the number correctly and was awarded a Power of Veto to use on one of the nominees. She also earned immunity for herself but was not able to compete in the Power of Veto competition.
 : As a result of Marie-Chantal deciding to walk from the game, the planned eviction for Day 22 was cancelled.
 : As a result of Varda walking from the game, the planned eviction for Day 36 was cancelled.
 : Week 6 was "Red Week". The Boss of the House would have to nominate three housemates and the Power of Veto was required to be used. On eviction night, the voting housemates would each vote for which two of the three housemates they wished to evict, and the two with the most votes left the house.
 : Over the next four weeks, following the vote, the evicted housemate was given the opportunity to compete in a redemption challenge. Success meant a return to the game, while failure meant their eviction stood. On Day 57, Maxime was evicted after declining to participate in the redemption challenge. On Day 64, Kevin was evicted after failing the redemption challenge. On Day 71, Camille successfully completed her redemption challenge, returned to the house and was immune from eviction the following week. On Day 78, Richardson failed his redemption challenge and was evicted from the house.
 : The final Boss of the House competition was a three-part contest that took place over the course of the final week in the house. The winner of Part 1 would automatically advance to Part 3 of the competition. The two housemates who did not win Part 1 would compete Part 2 of the competition. The winners of the first two challenges would compete in Part 3 to determine the final Boss of the House. They would then cast the final vote to evict, with that evicted housemate becoming the last member of the jury.
 : During the finale, the jury, consisting of the previously evicted ex-housemates, voted for the person they wanted to win. Marie-Chantal elected not to participate in the vote.

Ratings 
Ratings of eviction shows are taken from Numeris.

 Four episodes of daily shows Big Brother Célébrités Quotidienne from 22 March to 25 March 2021 combined ranked thirtieth place, received 0.637 of total viewers.

References 

2021 Canadian television seasons
Celebrity Big Brother seasons